Dewar is a town in Okmulgee County, Oklahoma, United States. The population was 818 at the 2010 census, a decline of 11.0 percent from the figure of 919 recorded in 2000. Founded in 1909 by workers for the Missouri, Oklahoma and Gulf Railway (MO&G), it was named for William Peter Dewar, a railroad official. It incorporated in 1909.

Dewar has a history with coal in the large Henryetta Coal Formation: the Thirty-sixth annual report of the Department of Mines and Minerals from 1943 shows production by four coal companies in Dewar— Berkey Coal Company, Coal Creek Coal Company, Dewar Coal Company, and Martin-Geary Coal Company—with a combined total of over 13,600 tons of coal annually.  Dewar was along the route of the shortline Coalton Railway, later called the Okmulgee Northern Railway, which operated from Okmulgee south along the Deep Fork River carrying the coal out of the Dewar, Coalton and Schulter producing areas from 1916 to 1964.

Geography
Dewar is located at  (35.458946, -95.945973).

Demographics

As of the census of 2000, there were 919 people, 344 households, and 261 families residing in the town. There were 386 housing units at an average density of 419.7 per square mile (162.0/km2). The racial makeup of the town was 71.49% White, 0.33% African American, 19.80% Native American, 0.54% from other races, and 7.83% from two or more races. Hispanic or Latino of any race were 2.07% of the population.

There were 344 households, out of which 34.3% had children under the age of 18 living with them, 58.4% were married couples living together, 12.8% had a female householder with no husband present, and 24.1% were non-families. 23.0% of all households were made up of individuals, and 14.0% had someone living alone who was 65 years of age or older. The average household size was 2.67 and the average family size was 3.12.

In the town, the population was spread out, with 27.3% under the age of 18, 10.0% from 18 to 24, 24.8% from 25 to 44, 24.5% from 45 to 64, and 13.4% who were 65 years of age or older. The median age was 35 years. For every 100 females, there were 93.9 males. For every 100 females age 18 and over, there were 92.0 males.

The median income for a household in the town was $30,000, and the median income for a family was $35,417. Males had a median income of $27,625 versus $18,036 for females. The per capita income for the town was $12,188. About 11.5% of families and 15.2% of the population were below the poverty line, including 22.6% of those under age 18 and 17.4% of those age 65 or over.

References

External links
 Encyclopedia of Oklahoma History and Culture - Dewar 

Towns in Okmulgee County, Oklahoma
Towns in Oklahoma